Sno*Drift 2006 was a car rally held on January 27–29 January  as part of the Rally America ProRally and ClubRally series around Atlanta, Michigan. It was the 19th Sno*Drift event held, and the 16th to be held as part of a national series.

Event

Competitors 

Forty six teams began the national event.  In order of start they were:

References 

Rally America
2006 in American motorsport
2006 in rallying